The American Desk is a prospective office for trade deals at the White House announced by president-elect Donald Trump in October 2016. Mr. Trump said he intends to merge bureaux for trade policy in the Office of the United States Trade Representative, the United States Department of Commerce and other agencies with a new Office of Trade, which will report to the American Desk. The aim of the American Desk is to fold layers of inefficient bureaucracy, and prevent the delocalization of US corporate entities who employ US citizens.

References

Donald Trump 2016 presidential campaign
Foreign trade of the United States
White House